Virola peruviana is a species of tree in the family Myristicaceae.  It is found in Brazil (Amazonas, Pará), Colombia, Ecuador and Peru.  It grows to a height of about 35 m (100 ft).  The fruit is ellipsoidal, 14–24 mm long and 11–23 mm in diameter, forming groups of about 5 to 15.

Varieties
Virola peruviana var. tomentosa Warb., 1897

See also
Psychedelic plants

References

peruviana
Medicinal plants
Trees of Brazil
Trees of Colombia
Trees of Ecuador
Trees of Peru